Dennis Laurente (born July 29, 1977) is a Filipino professional boxer.

During his younger days, his family migrated to Agusan del Sur. He continued his studies in Sibagat, Agusan del Sur and later in 1997, they migrated again in Agusan del Norte where he had a stint of work in a factory line making durian candy in Butuan. Later, Laurente joined his parents in Leyte and did some work in the farm until he went to Manila to live with his uncle. A friend and pro boxer Aljun Corporal brought Laurente to Elorde in 1998.

He fights under the care of Johnny S. Elorde, President of the Johnny Elorde Management International, and his wife, Liza Elorde, a boxing care manager.

Professional career
Laurente started as a professional boxer on April 23, 1994, against Alberto Sososco. He won the bout via technical knockout in round 4.

He won his first title, the Philippines Games & Amusement Board (GAB) lightweight championship, on August 9, 2000, against veteran fighter Francis Velasquez. The bout was held in Manila and ended by unanimous decision, all in favor of Laurente. On May 4, 2001, he took on Thai boxer Prawet Singwancha but suffered his first ever loss by unanimous decision. The fight was for the PABA lightweight title. Despite the loss, Laurente won the vacant OPBF lightweight title against Yosuke Otsuka in his next bout on November 23, 2001. He defended the title a total of 7 times, but fell short to Chicashi Inada on March 5, 2005. After 3 more fights, Laurente moved to the light welterweight division.

Professional record

|-
| style="text-align:center;" colspan="9"|49 Wins (30 knockouts), 7 defeats, 5 Draw

|-  style="text-align:center; background:#e3e3e3;"
|  style="border-style:none none solid solid; "|No.
|  style="border-style:none none solid solid; "|Res.
|  style="border-style:none none solid solid; "|Record
|  style="border-style:none none solid solid; "|Opponent
|  style="border-style:none none solid solid; "|Type
|  style="border-style:none none solid solid; "|RoundTime
|  style="border-style:none none solid solid; "|Date
|  style="border-style:none none solid solid; "|Location
|  style="border-style:none none solid solid; "|Notes

|- align=center
|
|loss||49-7-5||align=left|  Takayuki Hosokawa
|
|
|
|align=left| Sumiyoshi SportsCenter, Osaka, Japan
|align=left|

|- align=center
|
|loss||49-6-5||align=left|  John Jackson
|
|
|
|align=left| Full Sail University, Winter Park, Florida, U.S.
|align=left|

|- align=center
|
|Win||49-5-5||align=left|  Tadashi Yuba
|
|
|
|align=left| Korakuen Hall, Tokyo, Japan
|align=left|

|- align=center
|
|Win||48-5-5||align=left|  Ely Pangaribuan
|
|
|
|align=left| The Flash Grand Ballroom, Elorde Sports Complex, Paranaque City, Philippines
|align=left|

|- align=center
|
|Win||47-5-5||align=left|  Singdet Nonpitayakom
|
|
|
|align=left| The Flash Grand Ballroom, Elorde Sports Complex, Paranaque City, Philippines
|align=left|

|- align=center
|
|Win||46-5-5||align=left|  Khomkaew Sithsaithong
|
|
|
|align=left| The Flash Grand Ballroom, Elorde Sports Complex, Paranaque City, Philippines
|align=left|

|- align=center
|
|Win||45-5-5||align=left|  Manopoi Singmanasak
|
|
|
|align=left| Midas Hotel and Casino, Pasay, Philippines
|align=left| 

|- align=center
|
|Win||44-5-5||align=left|  Dondon Lapuz
|
|
|
|align=left| The Flash Grand Ballroom, Elorde Sports Complex, Paranaque City, Philippines
|align=left|

|- align=center
|
|loss||43-5-5||align=left|  Kenny Abril
|
|
|
|align=left| Texas Station Casino, Las Vegas, Nevada, U.S.
|align=left|

|- align=center
|
|Win||43-4-5||align=left|  Jamed Jalarante
|
|
|
|align=left| The Flash Grand Ballroom, Elorde Sports Complex, Paranaque City, Philippines
|align=left|

|- align=center
|
|Win||42-4-5||align=left|  Eusebio Baluarte
|
|
|
|align=left| Dusit Thani hotel, Makati City, Philippines
|align=left|

|- align=center
|
|win||41-5-5||align=left|  Ayi Bruce
|
|
|
|align=left| MGM Grand, Las Vegas, Nevada, U.S.
|align=left|

|- align=center
|
|Win||40-4-5||align=left|  Cris Alag
|
|
|
|align=left| Sofitel Plaza Hotel, Pasay, Philippines
|align=left|

|- align=center
|
|Win||39-4-5||align=left|  Dondon Sultan
|
|
|
|align=left| Metro Naga Coliseum, Naga City, Philippines 
|align=left|

|- align=center
|
|win||38-4-5||align=left|  Rashad Holloway
|
|
|
|align=left| Cowboys Stadium, Arlington, Texas, U.S.
|align=left|

|- align=center
|
|Win||37-4-5||align=left|  Kompayak Sithsaithong
|
|
|
|align=left| The Flash Grand Ballroom, Elorde Sports Complex, Paranaque City, Philippines
|align=left|

|- align=center
|
|win||36-4-5||align=left|  Ben Tackie
|
|
|
|align=left| Gaylord Hotel, Grapevine, Texas, U.S.
|align=left|

|- align=center
|
|Win||35-4-5||align=left|  Laimankon Chuwatana
|
|
|
|align=left| Cuneta Astrodome, Pasay, Philippines
|align=left|

|- align=center
|
|win||34-4-5||align=left|  Zaid Zavaleta
|
|
|
|align=left| Blaisdell Center, Honolulu, Hawaii, U.S.
|align=left|

|- align=center
|
|win||33-4-5||align=left|  Marvin Cordova, Jr.
|
|
|
|align=left| Hard Rock Hotel and Casino, Las Vegas, Nevada, U.S.
|align=left|

|- align=center
|
|win||32-4-5||align=left|  Arturo Urena
|
|
|
|align=left| Sycuan Resort and Casino, El Cajon, California, U.S.
|align=left|

|- align=center
|
|win||31-4-5||align=left|  Steve Quinonez
|
|
|
|align=left| Mandalay Bay Hotel and Casino, Las Vegas, Nevada, U.S.
|align=left|

|- align=center
|
|Win||30-4-5||align=left|  Kongtoranee Por Surasak
|
|
|
|align=left| Centennial Hall, Manila Hotel, Manila, Philippines
|align=left| Super Lightweight Contest

|- align=center
|
|Win||29-4-5||align=left|  Moses Seran
|
|
|
|align=left| Le Pavilion, Pasay, Philippines
|align=left| Retains PABA Lightweight Contest

|- align=center
|
|Win||28-4-5||align=left|  Shinya Nagase
|
|
|
|align=left| Korakuen Hall, Tokyo, Japan
|align=left|

|- align=center
|
|Win||27-4-5||align=left|  Hero Yauw Katili
|
|
|
|align=left| The Flash Grand Ballroom, Elorde Sports Complex, Paranaque City, Philippines
|align=left| Retains PABA Lightweight Contest

|- align=center
|
|Win||26-4-5||align=left|  Somchai Nakbalee
|
|
|
|align=left| Chaiyaphum, Thailand
|align=left| Won PABA Lightweight Contest

|- align=center
|
|Win||25-4-5||align=left|  Rustam Nugaev
|
|
|
|align=left| Araneta Coliseum, Cubao, Quezon City, Philippines
|align=left|

|- align=center
|
|Loss||24-4-5||align=left|  Daudy Bahari
|
|
|
|align=left| Indosair Studio, Jakarta, Indonesia
|align=left| Vacant PABA super lightweight title

|- align=center
|
|win||24-3-5||align=left|  Yuri Yoshikawa
|
|
|
|align=left| Korakuen Hall, Tokyo, Japan
|align=left|

|- align=center
|
|win||23-3-5||align=left|  Stack Poncogati
|
|
|
|align=left| RCTI Studio, Jakarta, Indonesia
|align=left|

|- align=center
|
|draw||22-3-5||align=left|  Arnel Porras
|
|
|
|align=left| NBC Tent, The Fort, Fort Bonifacio, Taguig, Philippines
|align=left|

|- align=center
|
|loss||22-3-4||align=left|  Chikashi Inada
|
|
|
|align=left| Korakuen Hall, Tokyo, Japan
|align=left| lost OPBF lightweight title

|- align=center
|
|win||22-2-3||align=left|  Chikashi Inada
|
|
|
|align=left| Korakuen Hall, Tokyo, Japan
|align=left| retains OPBF lightweight title

|- align=center
|
|draw||21-2-4||align=left|  Kengo Nagashima
|
|
|
|align=left| Korakuen Hall, Tokyo, Japan
|align=left|

|- align=center
|
|draw||21-2-3||align=left| Fernando Montilla
|
|
|
|align=left| PAGCOR Grand Theater, Airport Casino Filipino, Parañaque City, Philippines
|align=left|retains OPBF lightweight title

|- align=center
|
|win||21-2-2||align=left|  Hengky Tobias
|
|
|
|align=left| Surabaya, Indonesia
|align=left|

|- align=center
|
|win||20-2-2||align=left|  Joey de Ricardo
|
|
|
|align=left| Jakarta, Indonesia
|align=left|

|- align=center
|
|win||19-2-2||align=left|  Andreas Seran
|
|
|
|align=left| Jakarta, Indonesia
|align=left|

|- align=center
|
|win||18-2-2||align=left| Fernando Montilla
|
|
|
|align=left| PAGCOR Grand Theater, Airport Casino Filipino, Parañaque City, Philippines
|align=left|retains OPBF lightweight title

|- align=center
|
|win||17-2-2||align=left| Ulyses Puzon
|
|
|
|align=left| The Flash Grand Ballroom, Elorde Sports Complex, Paranaque City, Philippines
|align=left|

|- align=center
|
|win||16-2-2||align=left| Japan
|
|
|
|align=left| International Conference Hall, Nagoya, Japan
|align=left|won OPBF lightweight title

|- align=center
|
|loss||15-2-2||align=left| Prawet Singwancha
|
|
|
|align=left| Bangkok, Thailand
|align=left|PABA Lightweight title

|- align=center
|
|loss||15-1-2||align=left| Ferdinand Andriano
|
|
|
|align=left| Jakarta, Indonesia
|align=left|

|- align=center
|
|win||15-0-2||align=left| Tirso Albia
|
|
|
|align=left|Cebu City Waterfront Hotel & Casino, Barangay Lahug, Cebu City, Philippines
|align=left|

|- align=center
|
|draw||14-0-2||align=left| Nonoy Gonzales
|
|
|
|align=left|Mabini Gymnasium, Mabini, Philippines
|align=left|Retains Philippines Games & Amusement Board (GAB) lightweight title

|- align=center
|
|win||14-0-1||align=left| Francis Velasquez
|
|
|
|align=left| The Flash Grand Ballroom, Elorde Sports Complex, Paranaque City, Philippines
|align=left|Won Philippines Games & Amusement Board (GAB) lightweight title

|- align=center
|
|win||13-0-1||align=left| Ariel Neri
|
|
|
|align=left| Paranaque City, Philippines
|align=left|

|- align=center
|
|win||12-0-1||align=left| Ian Fajardo
|
|
|
|align=left| Paranaque City, Philippines
|align=left|

|- align=center
|
|win||11-0-1||align=left| Noli Fabroa
|
|
|
|align=left| The Flash Grand Ballroom, Elorde Sports Complex, Paranaque City, Philippines
|align=left|

|- align=center
|
|win||10-0-1||align=left| Al Jongjong Abao
|
|
|
|align=left| Paranaque City, Philippines
|align=left|

|- align=center
|
|win||9-0-1||align=left| Bert Andales
|
|
|
|align=left| Paranaque City, Philippines
|align=left|

|- align=center
|
|win||8-0-1||align=left| James Andiso
|
|
|
|align=left| San Jose, Philippines
|align=left|

|- align=center
|
|win||7-0-1||align=left| Ronnie dela Costa
|
|
|
|align=left| The Flash Grand Ballroom, Elorde Sports Complex, Paranaque City, Philippines
|align=left|

|- align=center
|
|win||6-0-1||align=left| Francis Severino
|
|
|
|align=left| The Flash Grand Ballroom, Elorde Sports Complex, Paranaque City, Philippines
|align=left|

|- align=center
|
|win||5-0-1||align=left| Gary Ordoñez
|
|
|
|align=left| The Flash Grand Ballroom, Elorde Sports Complex, Paranaque City, Philippines
|align=left|

|- align=center
|
|win||4-0-1||align=left| Harold Smith
|
|
|
|align=left| The Flash Grand Ballroom, Elorde Sports Complex, Paranaque City, Philippines
|align=left|

|- align=center
|
|win||3-0-1||align=left| Vic Centeno
|
|
|
|align=left| The Flash Grand Ballroom, Elorde Sports Complex, Paranaque City, Philippines
|align=left|

|- align=center
|
|win||2-0-1||align=left| Junie Gabon
|
|
|
|align=left| Butuan, Philippines
|align=left|

|- align=center
|
|draw||1-0-1||align=left| Digoy Esparago
|
|
|
|align=left| Socorro, Philippines
|align=left|

|- align=center
|
|win||1-0-0||align=left| Alberto Sososco
|
|
|
|align=left| Butuan, Philippines
|align=left|

|-
| style="text-align:center;" colspan="9"|TKO - Technical Knockout,    KO - Knockout,   TD - Technical Decision,   RTD - Referee Technical Decision,   SD - Split Decision,   UD - Unanimous Decision,   D - Draw

References

External links
 

1977 births
Living people
Lightweight boxers
Light-welterweight boxers
Southpaw boxers
Boxers from Leyte (province)
People from Agusan del Sur
Boxers from Agusan del Sur
Filipino male boxers